Dicyemennea is a genus of worms belonging to the family Dicyemidae.

Species:

 Dicyemennea abasi McConnaughey, 1949
 Dicyemennea abbreviata McConnaughey, 1949
 Dicyemennea abelis McConnaughey, 1949
 Dicyemennea abreida McConnaughey, 1957
 Dicyemennea adminicula (McConnaughey, 1949)
 Dicyemennea adscita McConnaughey, 1949
 Dicyemennea antarcticensis Short & Hochberg, 1970
 Dicyemennea bathybenthum Furuya & Hochberg, 2002
 Dicyemennea brevicephala McConnaughey, 1941
 Dicyemennea brevicephaloides Bogolepova-Dobrokhotova, 1962
 Dicyemennea californica McConnaughey, 1941
 Dicyemennea canadensis Furuya, Hochberg & Short, 2002
 Dicyemennea coromadelensis Kalavati, Narasimhamurti & Suseela, 1978
 Dicyemennea curta Bogolepova-Dobrokhotova, 1962
 Dicyemennea discocephalum Hochberg & Short, 1983
 Dicyemennea dogieli Bogolepova-Dobrokhotova, 1962
 Dicyemennea dorycephalum Furuya & Hochberg, 2002
 Dicyemennea eledones (Wagener, 1857)
 Dicyemennea eltanini Short & Powell, 1969
 Dicyemennea filiformis Bogolepova-Dobrokhotova, 1962
 Dicyemennea gracile (Wagener, 1857)
 Dicyemennea granularis McConnaughey, 1949
 Dicyemennea gyrinodes Furuya, 1999 - parasitizes Octopus hongkongensis 
 Dicyemennea kaikouriensis Short & Hochberg, 1969
 Dicyemennea lameerei Nouvel, 1932
 Dicyemennea littlei Short & Hochberg, 1970
 Dicyemennea longinucleata Bogolepova-Dobrokhotova, 1962
 Dicyemennea marplatensis (Penchaszadeh & Christiansen, 1970)
 Dicyemennea mastigoides Furuya, 1999 - parasitizes Sepia esculenta 
 Dicyemennea minabense Furuya, 1999 - parasitizes Sepia esculenta 
 Dicyemennea nouveli McConnaughey, 1959
 Dicyemennea ophioides Furuya, 1999 - parasitizes Octopus hongkongensis 
 Dicyemennea parva Hoffman, 1965
 Dicyemennea pileum Furuya, 2008
 Dicyemennea rossiae Bogolepova-Dobrokhotova, 1962
 Dicyemennea rostrata Short & Hochberg, 1969
 Dicyemennea ryukyuense Furuya, 2006
 Dicyemennea trochocephalum Furuya, 1999 - parasitizes Octopus hongkongensis 
 Dicyemennea umbraculum Furuya, 2009 - parasitizes Opisthoteuthis depressa

References

Dicyemida